Dragon's Lair is a television animated series by Ruby-Spears Productions based on the 1983 video game of the same name. Thirteen half-hour episodes were produced and aired from September 8, 1984, to April 27, 1985, on ABC.

Synopsis
The series chronicles the adventures of Dirk the Daring, who is the best knight in the kingdom of King Ethelred. Dirk performs all sorts of great deeds while protecting the kingdom and his love Princess Daphne from the forces of the evil dragon Singe. In his adventures there are several original characters like his stallion Bertram, his squire Timothy, and arrogant knight Sir Hubert Blunt who is Dirk the Daring's rival.

Before each commercial break, Dirk the Daring faces a cliffhanger situation. In keeping with the spirit of the game, the storyteller narrates Dirk's options and asks the viewer "What would you do?" After the commercial break, the outcomes of the various choices were shown before Dirk acts on the correct idea (with the occasional exception) to advance the story.

Several enemies from the original game also make their appearance as adversaries: the Lizard King, the Phantom Knight, the Smithee, the Giddy Goons, and the Mudmen. In the episode "The Legend of the Giant's Name", an Ardu giant awakened by Singe forces Dirk to find his way out of an enchanted cave, which gradually transforms him into a skeleton, much like the death animations of the game.

Episodes

Cast

Principal voice actors
 Bob Sarlatte as Dirk the Daring
 Ellen Gerstell as Princess Daphne
 Fred Travalena as King Ethelred
 Michael Mish as Timothy
 Arthur Burghardt as Singe the Dragon
 Peter Cullen as Bertram the Horse, Sir Hubert Blunt
 Clive Revill as Storyteller

Additional voices
 Marilyn Schreffler
 Michael Sheehan

Crew
 Alan Dinehart - Voice Director
 Howard Morris - Voice Director

Home media
On September 20, 2011, Warner Bros. released Dragon's Lair: The Complete Series on DVD in region 1 via their Warner Archive Collection. This is a Manufacture-on-Demand (MOD) release, available exclusively through Warner's online store and only in the US.

References

External links

 
 Episode guide at the Big Cartoon DataBase

1980s American animated television series
1984 American television series debuts
1985 American television series endings
American Broadcasting Company original programming
American children's animated action television series
American children's animated adventure television series
American children's animated fantasy television series
Animated series based on video games
Animated television series about dragons
Dragon's Lair
English-language television shows
Television series by Ruby-Spears